The Men's singles at the 2014 Commonwealth Games, was part of the lawn bowls competition, which took place between 27 July and 1 August 2014 at the Kelvingrove Lawn Bowls Centre.

Sectional play

Section A

Section B

Section C

Section D

Knockout stage

Quarterfinals

Semifinals

Finals

Gold medal match

Bronze medal match

References

Women's fours